Arend d'Angremond Lijphart (born 17 August 1936) is a Dutch-American political scientist specializing in comparative politics, elections and voting systems, democratic institutions, and ethnicity and politics. He is Research Professor Emeritus of Political Science at the University of California, San Diego. He is influential for his work on consociational democracy and his contribution to the new Institutionalism in political science.

Biography
Lijphart was born in Apeldoorn, Netherlands in 1936. During his youth, he experienced World War II and he attributed his aversion "to violence" and interest "in questions of both peace and democracy" to this experience.

He has a B.A. from Principia College in 1958 and a PhD in political science from Yale University in 1963. Lijphart taught at Elmira College (1961–63), the University of California, Berkeley (1963–68), at Leiden University (1968–78), and the University of California, San Diego (UCSD) (1978–2000). He became a professor emeritus at UCSD in 2000.

Dutch by birth, he has spent most of his working life in the United States and became an American citizen. He has since regained his Dutch citizenship and is now a dual citizen of both the Netherlands and the United States.

Awards and honors

Over his career, Lijphart has received many awards and honors:

 1984–85 Guggenheim fellow
 1989 Elected to the American Academy of Arts and Sciences
 1995 to 1996 Served as President of the American Political Science Association. 
 In 1993 he became foreign member of the Royal Netherlands Academy of Arts and Sciences.
 1997 Awarded the prestigious Johan Skytte Prize in Political Science in 1997.
 1998 Elected to the British Academy
 2010 Received the Constantine Panunzio Distinguished Emeritus Award

Lijphart has also received honorary doctorate from Leiden University (2001), Queen's University Belfast (2004), and Ghent University (2009).

Major works

Consociationalism and consensus democracy
Lijphart is the leading authority on consociationalism, or the ways in which segmented societies manage to sustain democracy through power-sharing. Lijphart developed this concept in his first major work, The Politics of Accommodation: Pluralism and Democracy in the Netherlands (1968), a study of the Dutch political system, and further developed his arguments in Democracy in Plural Societies: A Comparative Exploration (1977).

In The Politics of Accommodation (1968), Lijphart challenges the influential pluralist theory and argues that the main factor in having a viable democracy in a strongly divided society is the spirit of accommodation among the elites of different groups.

In Democracy in Plural Societies (1977), Lijphart demonstrates that democracy can be achieved and maintained in countries with deep religious, ideological, linguistic, cultural, or ethnic cleavages if elites opt for a set of institutions that are distinctive of consociational democracy. In this book, Lijphart defines a consociational democracy in terms of four characteristics: (1) "government by grand coalition of the political leaders of all significant segments of the plural society," (2) "the mutual veto", (3) proportionality, and (4) "a high degree of autonomy of each segment to run its own internal affairs." Lijphart's work challenged the then influential view that democracy could only be stable in countries with a homogenous political culture.

Beginning with his book Democracies: Patterns of Majoritarian & Consensus Government in Twenty-one Countries (1984), Lijphart focused on the broader contrast between majoritarian democracy and consensus democracy. While Lijphart advocated consociationalism primarily for societies deeply divided along ethnic, religious, ideological, or other cleavages, he sees consensus democracy as appropriate for any society with a consensual political culture. In contrast to majoritarian democracies, consensus democracies have multiparty systems, parliamentarism with oversized (and therefore inclusive) cabinet coalitions, proportional electoral systems, corporatist (hierarchical) interest group structures, federal structures, bicameralism, rigid constitutions protected by judicial review, and independent central banks. These institutions ensure, firstly, that only a broad supermajority can control policy and, secondly, that once a coalition takes power, its ability to infringe on minority rights is limited.

In Patterns of Democracy (1999, 2nd ed., 2012), Lijphart classifies thirty-six democracies using these attributes. He finds consensus democracies to be "kinder, gentler" states, having lower incarceration rates, less use of the death penalty, better care for the environment, more foreign aid work, and more welfare spending – qualities he feels "should appeal to all democrats". He also finds that consensus democracies have a less abrasive political culture, more functional business-like proceedings, and a results-oriented ethic. The 2012 edition included data up to 2010 and found proportional representation (PR) was vastly superior for the "quality of democracy", being statistically significantly better for 19 of 19 indicators. On the issue of "effective government" 16 out of 17 indicators pointed to PR as superior, with 9 out of 17 statistically significant. These results held up when controlling for the level of development and population size.

Peter Gourevitch and Gary Jacobson argue that Lijphart's work on democracy make him "the world's leading theorist of democracy in sharply divided societies." Nils-Christian Bormann claims that "Arend Lijphart's typology of democratic systems has been one of the major contributions to comparative political science in the last decades." Gerardo L. Munck and Richard Snyder hold that "Arend Lijphart is a leading empirical democratic theorist who reintroduced the study of political institutions into comparative politics in the wake of the behavioral revolution."

Methodology
Lijphart has also made influential contributions to methodological debates within comparative politics, most notably through his 1971 article "Comparative Politics and the Comparative Method," published in the American Political Science Review.

In this article Lijphart argues that the comparative method can be understood in contrast to the experimental and statistical methods and claims that the main difficulty facing the comparative method is that "it must generalize on the basis of relatively few empirical cases." To solve this problem, Lijphart suggests four solutions:
 (1) "increasing the number of cases as much as possible by means of longitudinal extension and a global range of analysis" 
 (2) "Reducing the property space of the analysis"
 (3) "Focusing the comparative analysis on 'comparable' cases"
 (4) "Focusing on the key variables"

Lijphart also discusses the case study method and identifies six types of case studies:
 (1) Atheoretical
 (2) Interpretative
 (3) Hypothesis-generating
 (4) Theory-confirming
 (5) Theory-infirming
 (6) Deviant case analyses

Lijphart work on methodology drew on ideas developed by Neil Smelser. It was also the point of departure for the work by David Collier on the comparative method.

Publications

Books
 Lijphart, Arend. 1966. The Trauma of Decolonization: The Dutch & West New Guinea. New Haven: Yale University Press.
 Lijphart, Arend. 1968. The Politics of Accommodation. Pluralism and Democracy in the Netherlands, Berkeley, California: University of California Press.
 Lijphart, Arend. 1977. Democracy in Plural Societies: A Comparative Exploration. New Haven: Yale University Press. .
 Lijphart, Arend. 1984. Democracies: Patterns of Majoritarian & Consensus Government in Twenty-one Countries. New Haven: Yale University Press. .
 'Lijphart, Arend. 1985. 'Power-Sharing in South Africa. Berkeley: Institute of International Studies, University of California. .
 Grofman, Bernard, and Lijphart, Arend (eds.). 1986. Electoral Laws & Their Political Consequences. New York: Agathon Press. .
 Lijphart, Arend. 1994.  Electoral Systems and Party Systems: A Study of Twenty-Seven Democracies, 1945–1990. Oxford: Oxford University Press. .
 Lijphart, Arend, and Waisman, Carlos H. (eds.). 1996. Institutional Design in New Democracies. Boulder, Colorado: Westview. .
 Lijphart, Arend. 1999. Patterns of Democracy: Government Forms and Performance in Thirty-Six Countries. New Haven: Yale University Press. 
 Grofman, Bernard and Lijphart, Arend (eds.). 2002. The Evolution of Electoral & Party Systems in the Nordic Countries. New York: Agathon Press. .
 Lijphart, Arend. 2008. Thinking About Democracy. Power sharing and majority rule in theory and practice. New York, NY: Routledge. 
 Lijphart, Arend. 2012. Patterns of Democracy: Government Forms & Performance in Thirty-six Countries, Second Edition. New Haven: Yale University Press. 
 Taylor, Steven L., Matthew S. Shugart, Arend Lijphart, and Bernard Grofman. 2014. A Different Democracy: American Government in a 31-Country Perspective. New Haven: Yale University Press.

Articles and chapters
 Lijphart, Arend. 1968. ”Typologies of Democratic Systems.“ Comparative Political Studies 1(1): 3–44.
 Lijphart, Arend. 1969. "Consociational Democracy." World Politics 21(2): 207–25.
 Lijphart, Arend. 1971. "Comparative Politics and the Comparative Method." American Political Science Review 65(3):682–93.
 Lijphart, Arend. 1972. "Toward Empirical Democratic Theory: Research Strategies and Tactics." Comparative Politics 4(3): 417–32.
 Lijphart, Arend. 1975. "The Comparable-Case Strategy in Comparative Research." Comparative Political Studies 8(2): 158–77.
 Lijphart, Arend. 1997. "Dimensions of democracies". European Journal of Political Research 31: 193–204/
 Lijphart, Arend. 1998. "Consensus and Consensus: Democracy Cultural, Structural, Functional, and Rational-Choice Explanations." Scandinavian Political Studies 21(2): 99–108. (Lecture given by the Winner of the Johan Skytte Prize in Political Science, Uppsala, 4 October 1997.)
 Lijphart, Arend. 2000. "The Pros and Cons – but mainly Pros – of Consensus Democracy". Acta Politica 36(2): 129–39.
 Lijphart, Arend. 2000. "The Future of Democracy: Reasons for Pessimism, but Also Some Optimism." Scandinavian Political Studies 23(3): 245–283.
 Lijphart, Arend. 2001. "Democracy in the 21st century: Can we be optimistic?" European Review 9(2), 169–184.
 Lijphart, Arend. 2002. "Negotiation Democracy versus Consensus Democracy: Parallel Conclusions and Recommendations." European Journal of Political Research 41(1):107–113.
 Lijphart, Arend. 2004. "Constitutional Design for Divided Societies." Journal of Democracy 15,2: 96–109.
 Lijphart, Arend. 2013. "Steps in My Research and Thinking About Power Sharing and Democratic Institutions." Taiwan Journal of Democracy Special issue, 1–7.
 Lijphart, Arend. 2018. "Consociationalism After Half a Century," pp. 1–9, in Michaelina Jakala, Durukan Kuzu, and Matt Qvortrup (eds.). Consociationalism and Power-Sharing in Europe. Arend Lijphart's Theory of Political Accommodation. Cham: Palgrave Macmillan.

 Further reading 
 Summaries of Lijphart's major works 
 Andeweg, Rudy. 2001. "Lijphart versus Lijphart: The Cons of Consensus Democracy in Homogenous Societies." Acta Politica 36(2): 117–28.
 Bormann, Nils-Christian. 2010. "Patterns of Democracy and Its Critics." Living Reviews in Democracy.
 Crepaz, Markus M. L., Thomas A. Koelble, and David Wilsford (eds.). 2000. Democracy and Institutions: The Life Work of Arend Lijphart. Ann Arbor: University of Michigan Press.
 Jakala, Michaelina, Durukan Kuzu, and Matt Qvortrup (eds.). 2018. Consociationalism and Power-Sharing in Europe. Arend Lijphart's Theory of Political Accommodation. Cham: Palgrave Macmillan.
 Lustick, Ian S. 1997. "Lijphart, Lakatos, and Consociationalism." World Politics Vol. 50, No. 1: 88–117.
 Gourevitch, Peter, and Gary Jacobson. 1995. "Arend Lijphart, A Profile." PS: Political Science & Politics 28(4): 751–754.
 Grofman, Bernard. 1997. "Arend Lijphart and the 'New Institutionalism'". UC Irvine, CSD Working Papers.
 Hadenius, Axel. 2002. "Power-Sharing and Democracy: Pros and Cons of the Rustow-Lijphart Approach", pp. 65–86, in Ole Elgström and Goran Hyden (eds.), Development and Democracy: What Have We Learned and How? New York: Routledge and ECPR.
 Munck, Gerardo L. and Richard Snyder. 2007. "Arend Lijphart: political institutions, divided societies, and consociational democracy," pp. 234–272, in Gerardo L. Munck and Richard Snyder, Passion, Craft, and Method in Comparative Politics. Baltimore, Md.: The Johns Hopkins University Press. [Interview with Arend Lijphart]
 Schouten, Peer. 2008. "Theory Talk #8: Arend Lijphart on Sharing Power in Africa and the Future of Democracy," Theory Talks (26-05-2008). 
 Taagepera, Rein. 2003. "Arend Lijphart's Dimensions of Democracy: Logical Connections and Institutional Design." Political Studies 51(1): 1–19.
 Taiwan Foundation of Democracy. 2013. Special Issue of Taiwan Journal of Democracy'' (May 2013) in honor of Arend Lijphart.

References

External links
 Arend Lijphart at UCSD
 Lijphart Elections Archive

1936 births
Living people
Dutch political scientists
People from Apeldoorn
Dutch emigrants to the United States
American political scientists
Scholars of nationalism
Members of the Royal Netherlands Academy of Arts and Sciences
Corresponding Fellows of the British Academy
Principia College alumni
Yale University alumni
University of California, San Diego faculty
Elmira College faculty
University of California, Berkeley faculty
Academic staff of Leiden University